The Romanian Dynamic Shooting Association, Romanian Romania tir Dynamic, is the Romanian association for practical shooting under the International Practical Shooting Confederation.

External links 
 Official homepage of the Romanian Dynamic Shooting Association

References 

Regions of the International Practical Shooting Confederation
Sports organizations of Romania
Sports organizations established in 2009
2009 establishments in Romania